"If You Were a Sailboat" is a song by British singer Katie Melua. Written and produced by Mike Batt, it is Melua's ninth single and the first from her third album, Pictures (2007). Melua said of the song:

It was released as a single on September 24, 2007. The CD single has three extra tracks exclusive to the release, including a version of David Gray's "This Year's Love". In the week of 30 September, the song debuted at number twenty-three on the UK Singles Chart.

Parody version 
Mark Radcliffe of BBC Radio 2 was amused by the lyric 'If you were a piece of wood, I'd nail you to the floor', and asked his listeners to send in equally strange lyrics and compose a parody song for her to sing, not expecting her to actually do so.

However, as she also did on another show with "Nine Million Bicycles", Melua contacted the show and agreed to play the song. The lyrics included 'If you were some tiling, I would grout you.' and 'If you were ten pints of beer, I would drink you down my dear'.

Track listings 
 "If You Were a Sailboat"
 "Junk Mail"
 "Straight to DVD"
 "This Year's Love"

Charts

Weekly charts

Year-end charts

Notes

External links
Katie Melua website

2007 singles
Katie Melua songs
2000s ballads
Songs written by Mike Batt
Song recordings produced by Mike Batt
2007 songs